The Joel S. Fisk House, at 123 N. Oakland Ave. in Green Bay, Wisconsin was built in 1865 in the Italianate style, a distinct 19th-century phase of Classical architecture. It was listed on the National Register of Historic Places in 1978.  It is also a contributing building in the NRHP-listed Oakland–Dousman Historic District.

It is a two-story Italianate cream brick building, with a one-and-one-half-story wing to the right rear.  Its hipped roof has a cupola, consistent with Italianate style, with double pairs of round-arched windows.

History
Also known as the William Gibbs House, the property was owned by local postmaster Joel S. Fisk. It would later be used as a public library. Eventually, it was added to the National Register of Historic Places in 1978 and to the State Register of Historic Places in 1989.

References

Houses on the National Register of Historic Places in Wisconsin
Libraries on the National Register of Historic Places in Wisconsin
National Register of Historic Places in Brown County, Wisconsin
Buildings and structures in Green Bay, Wisconsin
Italianate architecture in Wisconsin
Brick buildings and structures
Houses completed in 1867